Jacob Anders Markström (born 31 January 1990) is a Swedish professional ice hockey goaltender and plays for the Calgary Flames of the National Hockey League. He was selected by the Florida Panthers in the second round, 31st overall, of the 2008 NHL Entry Draft. He has also played for the Vancouver Canucks.

Playing career

Brynäs IF
Markström signed a two-year contract with the Brynäs IF senior team on 12 May 2008. He had previously been playing for the Brynäs IF junior team. The following month, after solid performances in the Swedish Hockey League and internationally for Sweden in the Under 18 and World Junior tournaments, the butterfly style goaltender was selected 31st overall in the 2008 NHL Entry Draft as the first choice of the Florida Panthers.

In 2009–10, Markström led the Elitserien in the save percentage (SVS%) and goals against average (GAA) statistics, with 92.72% and 2.01 respectively. On 1 June 2010, it was announced that the Panthers and Markström had agreed to terms on an entry-level contract.

Florida Panthers
On 23 January 2011, Markström made his NHL debut at the Prudential Center in Newark when he replaced starter Scott Clemmensen at the start of the second period in a loss against the New Jersey Devils. Upon his debut, he became the youngest goaltender to ever play for the Panthers.

Markström was then sent back to Florida's AHL affiliate team, the Rochester Americans. The team directives argued that Markström needed to get used to hockey in North America since players had different shooting tendencies. The goaltender struggled during his first season in the AHL and also injured his knee. After surgery in South Florida, Markström worked to get back in the game, hoping to have a real shot at the NHL level.

With Tomáš Vokoun departing via free agency for the Washington Capitals, Markström attended Florida's September 2011 training camp to compete for a starting or backup position with fellow goaltenders José Théodore and Scott Clemmensen, ultimately being awarded the backup role when Clemmensen was injured. On 22 October, Markström earned his first NHL win when he played in the third period against the New York Islanders and made 18 saves on 18 shots.

Markström started the lockout shortened 2012–13 season in the AHL, but with the starter José Théodore suffering an injury on 2 March that forced him to miss the rest of the season, Markström was given the de facto full-time role, starting most of their games during the remainder of the season.

Vancouver Canucks

It was believed that Markström would become the full-time starter for the Panthers at the beginning of the 2013–14 season, as Théodore was not retained and Markström signed a two-year contract extension. However, the Panthers would sign Tim Thomas to a one-year contract, and Markström was subsequently demoted to the AHL again. On 4 March 2014, he was traded by the Panthers, along with forward Shawn Matthias, to the Vancouver Canucks in exchange for Roberto Luongo and Steven Anthony, where he served as Vancouver's backup behind fellow Swede Eddie Läck.

Markström failed to make the Canucks out of training camp during the 2014–15 season. After clearing waivers, he was assigned to the Canucks' AHL affiliate, the Utica Comets. Following an injury to Ryan Miller, Markström was recalled to the Canucks to serve as backup to Eddie Läck and got to play on 3 March 2015, against the San Jose Sharks, but was pulled after he allowed three goals on four shots. The Canucks went on to lose the game 6–2. Markström came into a game on 19 March 2015 against the Columbus Blue Jackets and made two saves on two shots. However, the Canucks went on to lose that game 6–2 as well. Markström got his first and only win of the 2014–15 season when he made 26 saves on 27 shots on 22 March 2015, when the Canucks beat the Arizona Coyotes 3–1.

On 29 June 2015, Markström was re-signed to a two-year one-way contract with the Vancouver Canucks.

On 7 July 2016, Markström signed a three-year contract extension with the Canucks.

On 5 December 2017, Markström recorded his first NHL shutout, in a 3–0 Canucks victory over the Carolina Hurricanes.

On 12 December 2019, Markström recorded his fourth NHL shutout, stopping 43 shots on goal in a 1–0 Canucks victory over the Carolina Hurricanes, giving him a second-place franchise record for most shots stopped in a regular season game (tied with former Canucks goaltender Cory Schneider). On 3 January 2020, Markström was named to his first NHL All-Star Game, replacing the Vegas Golden Knights' goaltender Marc-André Fleury.

Calgary Flames
On 9 October 2020, Markström left the Vancouver Canucks as a free agent and signed a six-year, $36 million contract with the Calgary Flames. He finished with a record of 22–19–2 in 43 games in the pandemic-shortened 2020–21 season, having struggled with a concussion midway through following a collision with Canucks forward Tanner Pearson that was initially undiagnosed. The Flames narrowly failed to qualify for the 2021 Stanley Cup playoffs, finishing narrowly behind the Montreal Canadiens for the final berth in the all-Canadian North Division.

For the 2021–22 season, the NHL returned to its standard alignment, with the Flames again competing in the Pacific Division. Following a disappointing prior season that had seen a midseason coaching replacement, new coach Darryl Sutter spurred the team to one of its best in years. Markström had the best season of his career to date, managing a 37–15–9 record with a .922 save percentage and a league-leading nine shutouts. He was named a finalist for the Vezina Trophy, awarded to the league's best goaltender. The Flames won the Pacific Division, and advanced into the 2022 Stanley Cup playoffs to meet the Dallas Stars in the first round. The series against the Stars became a goaltending duel between Markström and Stars netminder Jake Oettinger, with the latter recording the highest save percentage of the first round, while Markström had the second-highest, and was "instrumental" to the Flames' eventual victory in seven games. The team faced the Edmonton Oilers in the second round, the first playoff series "Battle of Alberta" in 31 years. The match bore special significance for Markström, who had declined to sign with the Oilers in 2020, but he performed poorly in the series, recording a .852 save percentage in a five-game series loss.

International play

Markström has represented Sweden three times in junior tournaments. He backstopped the Swedes to a fourth-place finish in the IIHF World U18 Championships in 2008. The next year, he was placed on the Swedish World Juniors team and led all goaltenders with a .946 save percentage and finished second with a 1.61 GAA. Those impressive stats let him to earn Best Player honours at the goaltender position in 2009; his team also took home the silver medal. He again represented Sweden at the WJCs in 2010 and could not quite match his previous year's performance as Sweden earned a bronze medal. Markström did post a respectable .927 save percentage and a 2.21 GAA, both good enough for second place amongst goaltenders in the tournament.

In his first major tournament at a senior level, the 2010 World Championships, Markström played three games and recorded a shutout against Switzerland.

Markstrom then won the 2013 ice hockey world championships with Sweden. He was the backup to Jhonas Enroth, and played 2 games in the tournament. He won both games, allowing Sweden to ultimately win this tournament. 

Markström was named to Team Sweden for the 2016 World Cup of Hockey in Toronto. Named the backup goaltender, Markström played Sweden's opening game of the tournament after starter Henrik Lundqvist missed it due to an illness. In his lone game of the tournament, Markström helped Team Sweden defeat Team Russia 2–1. Sweden would end up losing in the semi-finals to Team Europe.

Career statistics

Regular season and playoffs
Bold indicates led league

International

References:

Awards and honours

References

External links
 

1990 births
Living people
Brynäs IF players
Calgary Flames players
Swedish expatriate ice hockey players in Canada
Swedish expatriate ice hockey players in the United States
Florida Panthers draft picks
Florida Panthers players
People from Gävle
Rochester Americans players
San Antonio Rampage players
Swedish ice hockey goaltenders
Utica Comets players
Vancouver Canucks players
Sportspeople from Gävleborg County